Temple is a town in Hillsborough County, New Hampshire, United States. The population was 1,382 at the 2020 census. It is home to Temple Mountain State Reservation, formerly the Temple Mountain Ski Area.

History 
The area was first called "Peterborough Slip", which included what is now the town of Sharon. In 1758, Maj. Ephraim Heald and his wife Sarah, along with his brother Deacon Peter Heald and Oliver Heald, a cousin, were among the first settlers. Peter Heald is generally considered to be the founder of Temple, and his child, Peter, was the first male child born in the town. In 1768, it was incorporated by colonial Governor John Wentworth, who named it after his lieutenant governor, John Temple.  Temple Glassworks was founded in 1780 by Robert Hewes of Boston. Although the company is long defunct, surviving examples of Temple glass are today rare and prized collectibles. By 1859 Temple had a population of 579, with two sawmills, one gristmill, and a tannery.  The town of Temple, Maine was named after Temple, NH.

Terrain is generally uneven and rocky. It is also elevated, commanding distant views to the east and south. As John Farmer and Jacob Bailey Moore wrote in 1823, "From the highest point of elevation, twenty meetinghouses may be seen when the atmosphere is clear."

Geography 
The town is drained to the east by Blood Brook and its tributary Temple Brook, part of the Souhegan River watershed. South of Route 101,  Temple Mountain forms the town's western boundary for several miles.

Adjacent municipalities 
 Greenfield, New Hampshire (north)
 Lyndeborough, New Hampshire (northeast)
 Wilton, New Hampshire (east)
 Greenville, New Hampshire (southeast)
 New Ipswich, New Hampshire (south)
 Sharon, New Hampshire (west)
 Peterborough, New Hampshire (northwest)

Demographics 

As of the census of 2000, there were 1,297 people, 440 households, and 347 families residing in the town.  The population density was 55.8 people per square mile (21.5/km).  There were 465 housing units at an average density of 20.0 per square mile (7.7/km).  The racial makeup of the town was 98.00% White, 0.31% African American, 0.31% Native American, 0.31% Asian, 0.54% from other races, and 0.54% from two or more races. Hispanic or Latino of any race were 0.69% of the population.

There were 440 households, out of which 42.3% had children under the age of 18 living with them, 67.5% were married couples living together, 6.6% had a female householder with no husband present, and 21.1% were non-families. 16.4% of all households were made up of individuals, and 5.2% had someone living alone who was 65 years of age or older.  The average household size was 2.91 and the average family size was 3.24.

In the town, the population was spread out, with 29.8% under the age of 18, 5.8% from 18 to 24, 30.7% from 25 to 44, 25.3% from 45 to 64, and 8.4% who were 65 years of age or older.  The median age was 37 years. For every 100 females, there were 102.7 males.  For every 100 females age 18 and over, there were 106.3 males.

The median income for a household in the town was $56,500, and the median income for a family was $64,297. Males had a median income of $36,563 versus $29,545 for females. The per capita income for the town was $21,897.  About 2.8% of families and 6.4% of the population were below the poverty line, including 4.2% of those under age 18 and 4.5% of those age 65 or over.

References

External links 
 
 Mansfield Public Library
 New Hampshire Economic and Labor Market Information Bureau Profile

 
Towns in Hillsborough County, New Hampshire
Towns in New Hampshire